The 1995 Italian motorcycle Grand Prix was the sixth race of the 1995 Grand Prix motorcycle racing season. It took place on 11 June 1995 at the Mugello Circuit.

500 cc classification

250 cc classification

125 cc classification

References

Italian motorcycle Grand Prix
Italian
Motorcycle Grand Prix